Ibrahimkhel or Ibrahimkhil (Pashto:ابراهيمخيل) is a major Pashtun tribe, living in places such as Kabul, Kandahar, Paktia, Paktika, Laghman, Jowzjan, Qunduz, Mazar-i-Sharif, Herat, Peshawar, Quetta, Upper Dir Lower Dir, Bajour and some other parts of Pakistan, as well as in a small village of Swat District named Biha near Matta. All the historical references show that the Ibrahimkhel are the descendants of the Ghiljis.

The Ibrahimkhel are known to be the most prevalent sub-tribe of the Babars. They primarily reside in Pirpiai, Choudhwan, Multan, Ibrahimkhel Kot, Zhob, Qila Saifullah, Dera Ghazi Khan in Pakistan. In Afghanistan, they have communities in Kandahar and Sheberghan. In India, they settled in the district of Bulandshahr. A very large number of the Ibrahimkhel tribes live in Kabul Province's Paghman District and Laghman Province.

Notable people
Popular Afghan legendary singer Ahmad Zahir belonged to Ibrahimkhel tribe from his father's side; Abdul Zahir, his father, was Ex-Prime Minister of Afghanistan.

See also
Ghilji

References

Ghilji Pashtun tribes
Pashto-language surnames
Pakistani names
Ethnic groups in Afghanistan